Edward Klabiński (7 August 1920 – 4 March 1997) was a professional racing cyclist from Poland. He was the first cyclist from Poland to take part in the Tour de France. He finished in 34th place at the 1947 Tour de France. He also rode in the 1948 Tour de France where he finished 2nd on two stages, and placed 18th overall.
Klabiński won the first edition of the Critérium du Dauphiné Libéré.

Major results
Sources:
1947
 1st  Overall Critérium du Dauphiné Libéré
 1st Charleroi - Chaudfontaine
 1st Critérium de Charleroi
 1st Prix Petitjean
 2nd Hautmont
 3rd Paris-Valenciennes
1948 
 1st Grand Prix de Saint-Quentin
 1st Lille - Calais - Lille
 3rd Grand Prix de Fourmies
 3rd Tourcoing-Dunkerque-Tourcoing
1949
 1st Lille - Calais - Lille
1950
 1st GP de Fourmies
 1st Lille - Calais - Lille
 1st Stage 3 Tour de l'Ouest
 6th Gent–Wevelgem
 9th Paris-Bruxelles
 9th Grand Prix des Nations
1951
 6th Grand Prix du Midi Libre
1952
 6th Overall Tour du Nord
1953
 8th Overall Tour du Nord
1954
 1st Stages 8 & 9 Course de la Paix
1956
 1st Stage 1 Tour de Champagne

Grand Tour general classification results timeline

References

External links
Biography in French

1920 births
1997 deaths
Polish male cyclists
People from Herne, North Rhine-Westphalia
Sportspeople from Arnsberg (region)
Polish expatriates in Germany
Polish emigrants to France